Di Cecco is an Italian surname. Notable people with the surname include:

Alberico Di Cecco (born 1974), Italian long-distance runner
Domenico Di Cecco (disambiguation), various individuals
Felice Di Cecco (born 1994), Italian footballer
Giovanni di Cecco, 14th-century Italian architect
Gregorio di Cecco (born c. 1390, died after 1424), Italian painter

Italian-language surnames